Owensite is a mineral discovered in the Wellgreen Cu-Ni-Pt-Pd deposit, Yukon, with the formula (Ba, Pb)6(Cu, Fe, Ni)25S27. The mineral is related to djerfisherite, but lacks the Cl and monovalent metals found in the latter.

References 

minerals